Levy Rozman (born December 5, 1995), known online as GothamChess, is an American chess International Master and commentator. He produces content on the online platforms Twitch and YouTube.

Early life
Rozman was born in Brooklyn, New York, on December 5, 1995, and lived in both New York and New Jersey growing up. As a child of Russian immigrants, Rozman grew up speaking Russian as his first language and only started learning English in preschool. He began playing chess at the age of 6 as an extracurricular activity and entered his first tournament at the age of 7. Rozman attained the titles of National Master in 2011 through the US Chess Federation, FIDE Master in 2016, and International Master in 2018. Rozman started as a scholastic chess coach in 2014.

Rozman attended Baruch College where he completed a Bachelor's degree in statistics and quantitative modeling in 2017. Before focusing on chess as a full-time career, he worked as a client service associate for UBS Wealth Management.

Online career
Rozman is a Twitch streamer and YouTuber. As of March 2, 2023, he has the most-subscribed chess channel on YouTube, with over 3 million subscribers; additionally, he currently has the highest total view count of any chess-focused channel, amassing over a billion views, the first chess channel to accomplish this. Rozman works closely with Chess.com and has been part of their streaming partnership since 2017. Rozman is a regular commentator for the platform, analyzing tournaments like PogChamps and the 2020 Candidates Tournament.

Like many online chess personalities, Rozman experienced a viewership surge during the COVID-19 pandemic, particularly following the release of the TV miniseries The Queen's Gambit. However, his growth rate did not stop there. As of November 2022, Rozman's YouTube channel had had a total view count of more than half a billion views and 98 videos with a million views. In the space of just 3 months, starting with December 2022, Rozman experienced another surge in viewership, eclipsing a billion views, including 185 total videos with a million views or more. For reference, in the year preceding December 2022, Rozman had been averaging about 20 million views, but this average soared to about 155 million per month, including one month of over 200 million new views.

As for his video content, typical video examples include an instructional opening overview where he discusses how to play openings, such as the Queen's Gambit, or a video where he plays against the Beth Harmon bot on Chess.com. He has done in-depth explanations of games played in The Queens Gambit miniseries. Other common video concepts include analysis of low-Elo viewer games, all the way up to grandmaster-level games (particularly players like Magnus Carlsen and Hikaru Nakamura) and beyond, including chess engines such as Stockfish or AlphaZero. Rozman's YouTube channel reached 1 million subscribers on June 1, 2021.

Rozman entered international news in March 2021 when he was defeated by an Indonesian chess player nicknamed Dewa_Kipas or "God of Fans". Rozman suspected that his opponent was cheating, and he reported his opponent's account to the Chess.com Fair Play Team. Dewa_Kipas' account was later closed for cheating (and Dewa_Kipas later was unable to play at a high level in a series of live matches), which drew backlash from Indonesian netizens and resulted in Rozman being harassed on social media. Rozman later went private on his social media accounts and took a short hiatus from streaming.

On July 11, 2022, Rozman announced his retirement from "competitive chess events" due to physical and mental stress.

Philanthropy
On October 14, 2021, Rozman announced the Levy Rozman Scholarship Fund, through which he is donating $100,000 to elementary-, middle-, and high-school chess programs. The fund is administered by ChessKid, a subsidiary of Chess.com, and schools can be awarded between $5,000 and $15,000 to pay for the costs of training, tournament fees, and travel expenses.

Awards and nominations

References

External links
Official website
 

1995 births
Living people
People from Brooklyn
American chess players
American people of Russian descent
American YouTubers
Chess International Masters
Gaming YouTubers
Twitch (service) streamers
Baruch College alumni